Pesé District is a district (distrito) of Herrera Province in Panama. The population according to the 2000 census was 12,471. The district covers a total area of 284 km². The capital lies at the city of Pesé.

Administrative divisions
Pesé District is divided administratively into the following corregimientos:

Pesé (capital)
Las Cabras
El Pájaro
El Barrero
El Pedregoso
El Ciruelo
Sabanagrande
Rincón Hondo

References

Districts of Panama
Herrera Province